Chervonohrad (former Polish name: Krystynopol) is a mining city and the administrative center of Chervonohrad Raion,  Lviv Oblast of western Ukraine. It hosts the administration of Chervonohrad urban hromada, one of the hromadas of Ukraine. Chervonohrad  lies about 62 km north of Lviv, 7 km from Sokal, 28 km northeast of the town of Voroniv, and has a population of

History

The city was part of the Polish Kingdom in the Polish–Lithuanian Commonwealth since its foundation in 1692 until 1772, when it was incorporated into the Habsburg Empire. During the interwar period, it belonged to the Second Polish Republic, and between 1945 and 1951 was part of the Polish People's Republic. It passed from Poland to the Ukrainian SSR after the territorial exchange in 1951 and had its name changed to Chervonohrad.

In May 1685, the Crown hetman and Kraków Voivode Feliks Kazimierz Potocki purchased land along the Bug River. In 1692, he founded a city on the lands of the village "Novyi Dvir" (literally "New Garden", Polish: Nowy Dwór) and named it "Krystynopol" after his wife Krystyna Lubomirska (the suffix  "-pol" derives from Greek "polis"). Potocki made the city his family center. He died here on September 22, 1702. His grandson Franciszek Salezy Potocki built a palace and in 1763 founded a monastery of Basilians (barocco church of Saint George; prior to 1946 – a place of miracles with wondrous icon of the Mother of God). 

In the 19th century, the "Apostolus Christinopolitanus" and famous chronicle from 1763 to 1779 were kept in the city. The Catholic order of Myrrh-Bearing Sisters was founded by Fr. Yulian Datsii in 1910, with the purpose of gathering funds to build a home for orphans and the poor. The first members of the congregation vowed to build two buildings: one for the people and one for the congregation. In 1913 the first convent arose, where 15 sisters lived.

Among the landmarks of the city is Count Potocki's palace, constructed by the order of Feliks Kazimierz Potocki after 1692.

A local newspaper is published in the city since June 1962.

On August 1, 1990, Chervonohrad became the first city in the Soviet Union where a monument to Vladimir Lenin was removed.

Until 18 July 2020, Chervonohrad was designated as a city of oblast significance and belonged to Chervonohrad Municipality. As part of the administrative reform of Ukraine, which reduced the number of raions of Lviv Oblast to seven, Chervonohrad Municipality was merged into newly established Chervonohrad Raion. Before being abolished, Chervonohrad Municipality also included the city of Sosnivka (until 2019) and the urban type settlement of Hirnyk.

Krystynopol Jews

Presently, there are 11–100 Jews residing in Chervonohrad. The earliest known Jewish community dates back to 1740. In 1931 the Jewish population was 2,200. The Jewish cemetery dates from 18th century with the last known Hasidic burial in 1941. Krystynopol Jews were deported to the Belzec extermination camp in September, 1942. The Jewish surname and rabbinical family Kristinopoler / Kristianpoller stem from the city's former name, Krystynopol. Jewish immigrants to America from this city founded the Krystenopoler Synagogue and First Krystenopoler Sick Benevolent Association Brith Isaac in New York. The Jewish cemetery is located in the town center, in Shevska Street.

Economics

Since 1951 the city became the center of newly emerged coal mining basin.
Other enterprises, besides the mining works, include:
 Iron-Beton Foundry
 Wood Processing Plant
 Tailoring Factory
 Stockings Factory
 Mines
 Dairy

Chervonohrad Coal Mines
Chervonohrad was started as a coal mining town. Currently, there are still many functional coal mines on the outskirts around the city:
 Шахта «Червоноградська»
 Шахта «Великомостівська»
 Шахта «Межирічанська»
 Шахта «Надія»
 Шахта «Степова»
 Шахта «Лісова»
 Шахта «Відродження»
 Шахта «Зарічна»
 Шахта «Візейська»

Education
 Branch of Lviv National Polytechnic University
 Mining College

Population
The population of Chervonohrad has increased significantly since 1939.
 1939 — 
 1959 — 
 1970 — 
 1974 — 
 1981 — 
 1989 — 
 2001 — 
 2005 — 
 2010 — 
 2013 —

Notable people 

 Janina Hurynowicz (1894–1967) a Polish doctor, neurophysiologist and neurologist.
 MamaRika (born 1989) a Ukrainian singer and actress.
 Franciszek Salezy Potocki (1700–1772) a Polish nobleman, diplomat and politician.
 Stanisław Szczęsny Potocki (1751–1805) a member of the Polish nobility and a military commander.
 Frank Taffel (1877-1947) a journalist, a founder of the Congregation Beth Jacob (Atlanta)
 Volodymyr Tykhyi (born 1970) a Ukrainian film director, screenwriter and film producer of documentaries and feature films.

Sport 
 Volodymyr Dykyi (1962–2021) a Soviet and Ukrainian footballer with over 500 club caps
 Roman Hnativ (born 1973) a former Soviet and Ukrainian footballer with 354 club caps
 Tetyana Klimchenko (born 1994) a Ukrainian professional racing cyclist
 Nazar Kulchytskyy (born 1992) a Ukrainian-American retired freestyle and folkstyle wrestler
 Mykola Morozyuk (born 1988) a Ukrainian footballer with over 330 club caps

Postal codes

80100-80110

References

External links
 
 History of Krystynopol-Chervonograd
 Inform Agency «KRYSTYNOPIL.INFO»
 Chervonograd Night
 An extensive history of Jewish Krystynopol
 History and pictures of Chervonograd
 Short history of Rome Catholic Church in Cherwonograd (Krystynopil)
 Holy Spirit Roman Catholic Church in Chervonograd
 Chervonohrad Online
 Business of Chervonohrad

 
Cities in Lviv Oblast
Mining cities and regions in Ukraine
Cities of regional significance in Ukraine
1690s establishments in the Polish–Lithuanian Commonwealth
Kingdom of Galicia and Lodomeria
Lwów Voivodeship
Holocaust locations in Ukraine
Jewish communities destroyed in the Holocaust
Socialist planned cities